Fucsia is a Colombian-based monthly magazine. It is the leading women's fashion magazine in Colombia. The magazine was launched in 2004 and is the Colombian edition of an Ecuadorian magazine with the same name. It is owned by the Publicaciones Semana S.A. As of 2014 Lila Ochoa was the director of the magazine.

References

External links

2004 establishments in Colombia
Magazines established in 2004
Magazines published in Colombia
Monthly magazines
Spanish-language magazines
Women's magazines
Women's fashion magazines
Mass media in Bogotá
History of women in Colombia